"Things Won't Go My Way"  is a single by the Bay Area collective Peach Tree Rascals, released on March 26, 2020 by Homemade Projects and 10K Projects.

Background and composition 
The song was the first single to be released in 2020 and the first song to be released under 10K Projects. The song talks about "feelings of self-doubt, the transitions of life and the dangers they present, and how disillusionment can get in the way of aspiration," according to Will Sisskind of The Deli.  The song has been describes as "genre-bending," much like most of their other songs.

On the song, the group commented "This song is special to us because it reminds us of something that’s often difficult to put into words. We always try to justify that there’s a particular thing preventing us from doing something, but at the end of the day - it always comes down to the fact that it’s a mindset and you’re often preventing yourself from getting where you want to be. … In the end, we’re all just trying our best and it’s about acknowledging that, knowing that we’ve all been there and felt that and that you can turn that feeling into something positive."

Music video 
The music video was released on March 26, 2020. It was inspired by the 1998 film The Truman Show, filming the video through fish-eyed lens. The Peach Tree Rascals shared that the video  "was fun to poke fun and make light of a bunch of negative situations. We tried to show that you can’t help but laugh at yourself when you go through something like that."

References 

Peach Tree Rascals songs
2020 singles
2020 songs